Carlos Villagrán Eslava (born 12 January 1944) is a Mexican actor, comedian, and former journalist best known for playing Quico in the Televisa sitcom El Chavo del Ocho.

Life and career
He was a newspaper writer for Mexico City. As a writer, he became friends with screenwriter and future co-star Rubén Aguirre. Aguirre was hired by Chespirito (Roberto Gómez Bolaños) to play Professor Jirafales in the then upcoming El Chavo del Ocho Televisa television series. Aguirre held a party for family and friends at his house, and Villagrán impressed him after expanding his cheeks out of proportion during one of the party's comic steps. As a matter of a fact, that movement would later become a trademark of the character he'd play in El Chavo.

Aguirre recommended Villagrán to Chespirito, and Villagrán was given the Quico character in the show. He also appeared on Chespirito's other hit show, El Chapulín Colorado. Both of Chespirito's shows became major international hits all over Iberoamerica, Spain, the United States and other countries. Villagrán acquired great fame with these shows.

Villagrán left the shows in 1978, mostly because he and Chespirito were engaged in a legal battle over the rights of the Quico character. At that same time, Ramón Valdés also left the two shows. This marked the beginning of the end for both productions, although they are still seen on many countries around the world with re-runs.

Villagrán went to Venezuela, where he acted in various Radio Caracas Televisión shows: El niño de papel (1981), Kiko Botones (1981), Federrico (1982), Las nuevas aventuras de Federrico (1983), and El circo de monsieur Cachetón (1985).   These were not successful as Chespirito's productions had been in Mexico. He and Valdés were reunited in Mexico when Telerey hired them to make the short-lived television show Ah que Kiko!. Chespirito was not able to prevent the name Kiko, with its different spelling, from being used in the new show. The show was successful until Valdés died of stomach cancer in 1988. For a brief time a local comic Sergio Ramos was brought in as Don Cejudo, but the chemistry was no longer there, so the show soon was taken off the air.

Like many of his co-stars in the Chespirito shows, Villagrán went on to enjoy a circus career, touring with his El circo de Kiko.

Villagrán later did what his friend Aguirre had done before, moving to Argentina, where Chespirito had no rights over the Quico character, and playing his old character there.

In 2000, in an El Chavo del Ocho special which reunited all the actors from the series (except Ramón Valdés, Angelines Fernández, Raúl Padilla, Horacio Gómez Bolaños, and Ana Lilian de la Macorra, who was not present), Villagrán and Chespirito reconciled their differences.

In 2017, the Brazilian movie "Como se Tornar o Pior Aluno da Escola" (literally translated: "How to become the worst student in the school") is announced, which was released in October in the same year and with Carlos Villagrán in the role of Ademar, the director of the school and antagonist of the film. It was based on the eponymous book by comedian and Brazilian TV presenter Danilo Gentili.

Personal life
Villagrán has three sons and three daughters.

References

External links

Chespirito actors
1944 births
Living people
Mexican male film actors
Mexican male television actors
Mexican male comedians
Mexican journalists
Male journalists
Mexican people of Spanish descent
Male actors from Mexico City
Mexican emigrants to Argentina